The 1966 Arkansas gubernatorial election was held on November 8, 1966. Winthrop Rockefeller was elected governor of Arkansas, becoming the first Republican to hold the office since Reconstruction.

The election occurred amidst strong midterm results for the Republican Party nationally, and in the traditionally-Democratic south. Republicans concurrently won the governorship of Florida also for the first time since Reconstruction, and only narrowly lost the governorship of Georgia, despite winning a plurality of the vote.

Democratic primary

Popular and powerful six-term (since 1955) incumbent Orval E. Faubus decided against seeking re-election. "Justice Jim" Johnson, a political ally of George C. Wallace of Alabama, ran a segregationist campaign with support of the White Citizens Council. A decade earlier, Johnson had run in the Democratic primary against Faubus, another segregationist, whom he accused of working behind the scenes for racial integration.

Candidates
 Thomas Dale Alford, former U.S. Representative and candidate for governor in 1962
 Sam Boyce, attorney and former State Representative
 Brooks Hays, former U.S. Representative and candidate for governor in 1930
 Frank Holt, State Supreme Court Associate Justice and Attorney General
 James D. "Justice Jim" Johnson, State Supreme Court Associate Justice, former State Senator and candidate for governor in 1956
 Raymond Rebsamen, insurance executive and Ford dealer
  Kenneth S. Sulcer, state senator and real estate broker

Results

 

Holt was supported by many younger, more liberal, Democrats, such as future governor and U.S. President Bill Clinton, who served as his campaign aide though he was not old enough to vote at the time.

Republican primary

A northeastern native, multimillionaire and scion of a prominent political/business family Winthrop Rockefeller was nominated with over 96% of the vote over Gus McMillan of Sheridan. Charges abounded that McMillan, a lifelong Democrat, was planted in the race by Faubus in order to force the Republicans to hold an expensive and needless primary. Rockefeller had been the GOP nominee in the 1964 election.

Campaign 

Rockefeller was an unusual candidate – an eastern establishment member and moderate-to-liberal party wing member (such as his brother, Governor Nelson Rockefeller of New York, an unofficial leader of this wing for many years).

The Republican Party at this time practically played only a most minor role in Arkansas politics.

However, his popularity and the break within Democratic camp, where many were outraged with Johnson's segregationist stances, and good year for the Republicans nationally helped Rockefeller to win.

Results

References 

1966
Gubernatorial
1966 United States gubernatorial elections
November 1966 events in the United States